Ligovsky Prospekt is a station on the Line 4 of Saint Petersburg Metro, opened on December 30, 1991.

Saint Petersburg Metro stations
Railway stations in Russia opened in 1991
Railway stations located underground in Russia